The 1990 Speedway World Pairs Championship was the twenty-first FIM Speedway World Pairs Championship.

The final took place at the Ellermühle Stadium in Landshut, Germany. The championship Final was dominated by favourites Denmark and the less fancied Australia. Danes Jan O. Pedersen and Hans Nielsen scored 43 points to narrowly beat Australians Todd Wiltshire and Leigh Adams who scored 41.  Hungary (Zoltán Adorján and Sándor Tihanyi) finished a distant third on 33 points. Sweden (Jimmy Nilsen and Per Jonsson) also finished on 33 points, though as Hungary scored three heat wins to one for the Swedes they were awarded third place.

Semifinal 1
  Prague, Markéta Stadium

Semifinal 2
  Wiener Neustadt, Stadion Wiener Neustadt

World final
  Landshut, Ellermühle Stadium
 Attendance: 10,000

See also
 1990 Individual Speedway World Championship
 1990 Speedway World Team Cup
 motorcycle speedway
 1990 in sports

References

1990
World Pairs
Speedway World Pairs